Hoback is a census-designated place (CDP) in Teton County, Wyoming, United States. The population was 1,176 at the 2010 census. It is part of the Jackson, WY–ID Micropolitan Statistical Area. The town is named for John Hoback, a mountain man who guided the Astor party through the area in 1811.

Geography
Hoback is located at  (43.315714, -110.772129).

According to the United States Census Bureau, the CDP has a total area of 44.35 square miles (114.9 km2), of which 43.46 square miles (112.5 km2) is land and 0.9 square mile (2.32 km2) (2.0%) is water.

Demographics
As of the census of 2000, there were 1,453 people, 577 households, and 386 families residing in the CDP. The population density was 8.2 people per square mile (3.2/km2). There were 678 housing units at an average density of 3.8/sq mi (1.5/km2). The racial makeup of the CDP was 96.77% White, 0.62% Native American, 0.41% Asian, 0.83% from other races, and 1.38% from two or more races. Hispanic or Latino of any race were 2.62% of the population.

There were 577 households, out of which 32.2% had children under the age of 18 living with them, 60.0% were married couples living together, 4.3% had a female householder with no husband present, and 33.1% were non-families. 19.6% of all households were made up of individuals, and 2.9% had someone living alone who was 65 years of age or older. The average household size was 2.52 and the average family size was 2.95.

In the CDP, the population was spread out, with 22.9% under the age of 18, 6.3% from 18 to 24, 35.6% from 25 to 44, 29.4% from 45 to 64, and 5.8% who were 65 years of age or older. The median age was 39 years. For every 100 females, there were 117.5 males. For every 100 females age 18 and over, there were 117.9 males.

The median income for a household in the CDP was $64,679, and the median income for a family was $80,387. Males had a median income of $36,613 versus $35,023 for females. The per capita income for the CDP was $32,753. None of the families and 3.3% of the population were living below the poverty line, including no under eighteens and 8.6% of those over 64.

Education
Public education in the community of Hoback is provided by Teton County School District #1.

See also

 List of census-designated places in Wyoming

References

External links

Census-designated places in Teton County, Wyoming
Census-designated places in Wyoming
Jackson, Wyoming micropolitan area